Daniel Junio de Jesus Nascimento (born 22 May 1998), known as Daniel Jesus, is a Brazilian professional footballer who plays as a defensive midfielder for Ukrainian club VPK-Ahro Shevchenkivka.

References

External links
 Profile on VPK-Ahro Shevchenkivka official website
 
 

1998 births
Living people
People from Ribeirão Preto
Brazilian footballers
Association football midfielders
Grêmio Novorizontino players
FC Nitra players
FC VPK-Ahro Shevchenkivka players
Ukrainian First League players
Slovak Super Liga players
Brazilian expatriate footballers
Expatriate footballers in Ukraine
Expatriate footballers in Slovakia
Brazilian expatriate sportspeople in Ukraine
Brazilian expatriate sportspeople in Slovakia